Acrolepiopsis tauricella is a moth of the family Acrolepiidae. It is found Italy, Switzerland, Hungary and Ukraine.

The larvae feed on Tamus communis. They mine the leaves of their host plant. Young larvae make one or two small full depth blotch mines. Most frass is ejected out of the mine though an opening in a corner of the mine. Older larvae live freely under the leaf, but keep using the mine as a shelter during feeding pauses. In this stage they cause window feeding or skeleton feeding. There are several mines in a single leaf. The larvae have a pale yellowish green body and head.

References

Acrolepiidae
Moths described in 1870
Moths of Europe